Rosemary Nyerere (27 October 1961 – 1 January 2021) was a Tanzanian politician, academic and daughter of the late Mwalimu Julius Nyerere, the founder and first president of United Republic of Tanzania.

Background and family
Nyerere was born on 27 October 1961 and is among the eight children of the late Mwalimu Julius Nyerere and Mama Maria Nyerere. She was baptized in St. Joseph's Cathedral, Dar es Salaam under the guardianship of family friends, Clemence Kahama and his wife, Victoria acting as her godparents and she also received her Holy Communion there. She married David Mwamakula on 21 May 1994 in Butiama. The couple were blessed with five children and three grandchildren, whom she was survived in death addition to him (David), her mother, Maria and both parents-in-law (her widower's parents).

On 1 January 2021, she died suddenly just after ringing into the New Year celebrations for the year 2021, in addition to celebrating her mother's birthday itself. On 6 January (Epiphany), in the Immaculate Chapel parish church located in the Upanga neighbourhood of Dar es Salaam they held a farewell requiem mass for her. She was later laid to her final resting place in the Pugu burial ground and her funeral service was attended by Prime Minister Kassim Majaliwa and then-Vice President Samia Suluhu who represented then-President John Magufuli in acting as main guests of honour in paying their last respects to her, both during her wakes from 2 to 5 January and on the funeral day as mentioned.

Education
Nyerere started her primary level education from 1967 to 1973, to Forodhani and later Bunge primary school. As from 1974 to 1977 she finished her lower secondary level education from Weruweru Secondary School and later from 1977 to 1979, she attended Korogwe High School for her upper secondary education. From 1987 to 1989, she furthered her studies in Mzumbe University (just after taking foundation studies in accountancy and finance for an extended period of eight years from 1979 to 1987 in The Institute of Finance Management at Dar es Salaam), studying an advanced diploma in certified accountancy, as she earned first class and received recognition awards, later only to graduate and become a part-time lecturer in her alma mater. In 1999, she continued her studies overseas in Britain, particularly at Strathclyde University, Glasgow, Scotland to pursue her master's degree in Investment and Finance.

Career
In 1991 to 1999, Nyerere was a part-time lecturer in The Institute of Finance Management (IFM) and later from 1990 to 1993 worked as an accountant in a local press and newsprint company known as The Central Tanganyika Press Ltd. based in Dodoma. In addition, she also served in several board positions (corporate/non-governmental) such as deputy board chairperson of Tambaza High School from 2010 to 2013. 
Then, from 2002 to 2008 she was the board director of Tanzania Investment Bank. 
From 2002 to 2005, she also served as one of the board members of the Ngorongoro Conservation Area. In addition, from 2000 to 2005, she was a MP for the Chama Cha Mapinduzi party's women special reserved seats quota.

See also

References

External links

1961 births
2021 deaths
Chama Cha Mapinduzi MPs
People from Musoma
Place of birth missing
Tanzanian women
Tanzanian Roman Catholics
Weruweru Secondary School alumni